Solidago gigantea is a North American plant species in the family Asteraceae. Its common names include tall goldenrod and giant goldenrod, among others.

Goldenrod is the state flower of Kentucky, and Solidago gigantea is the state flower of Nebraska.

Description
It often grows in clumps with no leaves at the base but numerous leaves on the stem. At the top, each stem produces a sizable array of many small flower heads, sometimes several hundred. Each head is yellow, containing both disc florets and ray florets.

Habitat
Solidago gigantea is found in a wide variety of natural habitats, although it is restricted to areas with at least seasonally moist soils.

Distribution
It is a widespread species known from most of non-arctic North America east of the Rocky Mountains. It has been reported from every state and province from Alberta to Nova Scotia to Florida to Texas, and also from the state of Nuevo León in northeastern Mexico.

Environmental impact
Solidago gigantea is highly invasive throughout Europe and Asia. In its non-native range, it exerts a negative impact on native communities by decreasing species richness and diversity, apparently due to its intense competitive effects, rapid growth, or polyploidization. In the non-native European range, several management options are applied, such as periodical flooding, mowing, mulching, grazing, or herbicide to reduce the negative impact of the species on native biodiversity.

Diseases
Parasitized by the Basidiomycete Coleosporium asterum.

References

External links
 Jepson Manual Treatment
 

gigantea
Symbols of Kentucky
Symbols of Nebraska
Flora of North America
Plants described in 1789
Taxa named by William Aiton